The Turks Today is  a book by Andrew Mango about Turkey's development since the death of the founder of Turkey, Mustafa Kemal Atatürk in 1938 until today. It is the sequel to his biography of Ataturk, Attaturk: The Biography of the Founder of Modern Turks.

See also
 History of Turkey

References

History of the Republic of Turkey
2006 non-fiction books